NightMare World are an English power metal band from Birmingham, England, formed in 2006.

History

No Regrets EP
In 2007 NightMare World recorded a three-track EP at Thin Ice Stuios. It was engineered, produced and mixed by Karl Groom of Threshold and was released in early 2009. All three tracks were later reproduced entirely on the band's debut album, In The Fullness Of Time.

In The Fullness Of Time
The band began work on their debut album in early 2010 and chose to continue working with Karl Groom at Thin Ice Studios. The album was recorded over a period of four years and was finally mastered by Peter Van't Riet in April 2014. Shortly after, the band signed to Pure Steel Records and the album was released on 15 May 2015.

Future
NightMare World have stated on social media that they are currently writing a second studio album. They had also stated that they would be recording with producer Chris Tsangarides. However, since Tsangarides' death in 2018 it is unclear where the album is being produced.

Band members

Current
 Pete Morten - Vocals (2007–present)

 Sam Shuttlewood - Lead Guitars (2006–present)
 Joe Cleary - Rhythm Guitars (2008–present)
 David Moorcroft - Bass Guitars (2010–present)

Former
 Billy Jeffs - Drums (2006–2020)
 Anthony Thompson - Keyboards (2017–2020)
 Jimi Nix - Lead Vocals (2006-2007)
 Georgia Levermore - Rhythm Guitars (2006-2007)
 Alex Baker - Bass Guitars (2006-2009)
 Nick Clarke - Keyboards (2007–2017)

Discography 
Studio albums
In The Fullness Of Time (album) (2015) 
EPs
No Regrets (EP) (2009)

References

External links

English power metal musical groups